Markham Moor is a village which lies five miles south of the town of Retford in Nottinghamshire. The village is in the civil parish of West Drayton. Markham Moor lies on the junction between the A1, A638 and A57 roads. The village was on the route of the old Great North Road and was also traditionally part of the East Markham parish.

Markham Moor junction 

Markham Moor has a junction in the middle of the village which links the A1 between London and Edinburgh, the A638 to Retford and the A57 to Lincoln. Previously, this junction was a simple roundabout, but as part of junction improvements by the Highways Agency between Blyth in Nottinghamshire and Peterborough, the junction changed to the current two level junction, with one roundabout at the north end for the A57 and A638, and another roundabout on the south side for the B1164 Great North Road to Tuxford. Both roundabouts are connected by a flyover.

A public inquiry was launched into the improvements in 2006 after a number of objections, the majority from the nearby village of Elkesley. The objectors were concerned with the timing of the improvements and increased traffic flow on the A1 which bypasses Elkesley. The upgraded junction was completed in October 2008.

Service area 

Markham Moor junction has a number of companies providing services for travellers travelling along the major trunk roads which meet at the Markham Moor junction, including McDonald's, a Travelodge, a historic hotel on the route of the old Great North Road and a truck stop. The services also held a Little Chef café, which was originally constructed as a petrol station and converted to a Little Chef in 1989 but disused from 2012 to 2019. Due to its unusual hyperbolic paraboloid shell roof, constructed in 1960–61 to designs by architect Hugh Segar (Sam) Scorer and structural engineer Dr Hajnal-Kónyi, there was a preservation campaign in 2004 to get the building listed to prevent it from being demolished as part of the Markham Moor junction improvement plans published by the Highways Agency. The plans were revised to save and improve access to the restaurant. The shell canopy was designated Grade II listed on 27 March 2012. It was purchased and redeveloped by Stockton-on-Tees based company, Cliff Court Developments Ltd, then re-opened as a Starbucks in December 2019.

References

External links

Villages in Nottinghamshire
A1 road (Great Britain)
Bassetlaw District
Road junctions in England